

Urdu poets
 Ali Sardar Jafri
 Majrooh Sultanpuri
 Sahir Ludhianvi
 Kaifi Azmi
 Nida Fazli
 Javed Akhtar
 Shakeel Badayuni

Marathi poets
 Narayan Surve
 Mangesh Padgaonkar

Hindustani poets
 Gulzar
 Javed Akhtar
 Majrooh Sultanpuri
 Sameer
 Prasoon Joshi

Indian English poets
Bombay Poets (or, Bombay School of Poets) is one which is known to redefine Indian English poetry. The school began in the 1960s, and have flourished ever since. It has includes persons who have also changed the perception of Indian poetry by performing in cultural hubs such as Soho, London, New York, and many more of such places. Their selected works have also been achieved at the Cornell Library. 
 Nissim Ezekiel
 R. Parthasarathy
 Dom Moraes
 Adil Jussawalla
 Arvind Krishna Mehrotra
 Dilip Chitre
 Gieve Patel
 Ranjit Hoskote
 Eunice de Souza
 Jerry Pinto
 Annie Zaidi
 Arun Kolatkar
 Santan Rodrigues
 Rochelle Potkar

See also
List of people from Mumbai

References

Poets from Maharashtra
Poets
Writers from Mumbai
Mumbai